Becoming may refer to:

 Becoming (philosophy), the dynamic aspect of being, in philosophical ontology
 Becoming, the condition for continued rebirth, according to Buddhism
 Becoming, a term used for potentiality

Arts and entertainment
 "Becoming" (song), a 1994 song by the band Pantera
 Becoming (TV series), a television show produced by MTV
 "Becoming" (Buffy the Vampire Slayer), a 1998 two-part episode of the TV series Buffy the Vampire Slayer
 "Becoming" (The 4400), episode of sci-fi TV series
 Becoming (Christine Denté album), 2003
 Becoming (Sarah Geronimo album), 2006
 Becoming (Ari Koivunen album), 2008
 Becoming (Kenichi Suzumura album), 2009
 Becoming (Yolanda Adams album)
 Becoming (Abigail Williams album), 2012
 Becoming, a 2013 EP and 2015 album by Courage My Love
 BEcoming (Stacy Barthe album), 2015
 Becoming (2020 horror film), an American film by Omar Naim
 Becoming (book), 2018 autobiography by Michelle Obama
 Becoming (2020 documentary film), an American film based on the book